A privateer was a private person authorized by a country's government by letters of marque to attack foreign shipping. Privateering was an accepted part of naval warfare from the 16th to the 19th centuries, authorised by all significant naval powers.

Notable privateers included:
 Victual Brothers or Vitalians or Likedeelers 1360–1401
 Gödeke Michels (leader of the Likedeelers) 1360–1401
 Klaus Störtebeker, Wismar, (leader of the Likedeelers),  1360–1401
 Didrik Pining, German, c. 1428–1491
 Paul Beneke, German, born in Hanseatic City of Danzig, Pomerelia c. 1440s–1490s
 Kemal Reis, Turkish, c. 1451–1511
 Oruç Reis (Barbarossa), Turkish, c. 1474–1518
 Barbarossa Hayreddin Pasha, Turkish, 1478–1546
 Turgut Reis (Dragut), Turkish, c. 1485–1565
 Timoji, Hindu, 1496–1513
 Murat Reis the Older, Turkish, c. 1506–1609
 Sir Francis Drake, English, c. 1540–1596
 Sir George Somers, English 1554–1610
 Captain Christopher Newport, English, c. 1561–1617
 Magnus Heinason, Faroese, c. 1568–1578 privateer in Dutch service under the Dutch revolt and 1580s, and privateer and merchant in Danish service on the Faroe Islands c. 1578–1589
 Piet Hein, Dutch, 1577–1629
 Alonso de Contreras, Spanish, 1582–1641, privateer against the Turks under the banner of the Order of Malta and later commanded Spanish ships
 James Erisey, English, 1585–1590s
 Peter Easton, England/Newfoundland, c. 1611–1614
 Sir Henry Morgan, Welsh, 1635–1688
 Jean Bart, French, 1651–1702
 William Dampier, English, 1652–1715
William Kidd, Scottish, c. 1654–1701 
 Nicolas Baeteman, Dunkirker 1659–1720
 Alexander Dalzeel, Scotland, c. 1662–1715
 René Duguay-Trouin, French, 1673–1736
 Kanhoji Angre, Maratha, 1698–1729
 Lars Gathenhielm, Swedish, 1710–1718
 Ingela Gathenhielm, Swedish, 1710/18–1721
 Fortunatus Wright, English of Liverpool, 1712–1757
 David Hawley, colonial United States, 1741–1807
 Jonathan Haraden, colonial United States, 1744–1803
 William Death, English, 1756
 Alexander Godfrey, colonial Nova Scotia, 1756–1803
 Jose Campuzano-Polanco, colonial Santo Domingo, 1689-1760
 Etienne Pellot, aka "the Basque Fox", French, 1765–1856
 Noah Stoddard, United States, 1755-1850
 Robert Surcouf, French, 1773–1827
 John Goodrich (1722-1785), Loyalist privateer in the American Revolution
 David McCullough, colonial United States, 1777-1778
 Jean Gaspard Vence, French, –1783
 Joseph Barss, Colonial Nova Scotia, 1776–1824
 Jean Lafitte 1776–1854, French Louisiana hero in the Gulf of Mexico
 John Ordronaux (privateer), United States, 1778–1841
 Ephraim Sturdivant, United States, 1782–1868
 Hipólito Bouchard, Argentina, 1783–1843
 Otway Burns, North Carolina, United States 1775–1850
 Wetheman (active 1151/52 – c.1170), Danish, Wendish Crusade

Privateers
List
Naval warfare of the Middle Ages
Naval warfare of the Early Modern period